Thomas Tsimpoukas (born 13 February 1999) is a Greek professional footballer who plays as a centre-back for Super League 2 club Almopos Aridea.

References

1999 births
Living people
Greek footballers
Greece youth international footballers
Super League Greece 2 players
Football League (Greece) players
Gamma Ethniki players
PAE Kerkyra players
Niki Volos F.C. players
Association football defenders
Footballers from Central Macedonia
People from Pieria (regional unit)